Shareeka Epps (born July 11, 1989) is an American actress. She is best known for starring in the 2006 film Half Nelson, alongside Ryan Gosling. She won the Independent Spirit Award for Best Female Lead for her performance in the film.

Life and career
After being discovered in junior high school, Epps starred in the low budget, short film Gowanus, Brooklyn alongside Matt Kerr, playing the role of "Drey", a high school student. The short film won the Short Filmmaking Award at "Sundance Film Festival" in 2004.

The success of Gowanus, Brooklyn led to a full-length feature film, Half Nelson. Released August 11, 2006 the story concerns an inner city middle-school teacher who forms a friendship with one of his students after she discovers that he has a drug habit. Epps reprised her role as "Drey" and the role of the teacher was replaced by Ryan Gosling. The film also starred rising star Anthony Mackie.

For Half Nelson, Epps won the Gotham Independent Film Award for Breakthrough Actor (2006); was named Best Supporting Actress by the Boston Society of Film Critics Awards (2006);
won the WFCC Award for Female Rights To Male Roles in Movies at the Women Film Critics Circle Awards (2006); and Best Female lead by the Independent Spirit Awards (2007).
Epps also received nominations from the Broadcast Film Critics Association; Alliance of Women Film Journalists; Broadcast Film Critics Association Awards; Chicago Film Critics Association Awards;, Online Film Critics Society Awards; St. Louis Film Critics Association, US and two Black Reel Awards nominations.

Epps graduated in 2007 from Binghamton High School in upstate New York, and attended SUNY Broome Community College, where she earned her associates' degree.

In 2007, Epps acted in Aliens vs. Predator: Requiem as Kendra although her portrayal of Kendra was almost entirely omitted from the theatrical as well as the home video release. She has one scene left in the final cut, as an extra at the Gunnison Diner along with her onscreen brother Meshach Peters.

Epps made her first TV appearance in an episode of Law & Order: Special Victims Unit airing on April 15, 2008, titled "Undercover" as Ashley Tyler. In 2013 she starred in American Milkshake alongside Tyler Ross and Georgia Ford.

In 2009, Shareeka provided spoken word vocals on the songs "Intro" and "Werewolf Heart" from Dead Man's Bones eponymous debut album. Ryan Gosling, who co-starred in Half Nelson, is one of the two members of Dead Man's Bones.

Epps currently resides in New York.

Filmography

Film

Television

Awards and nominations
Black Reel Awards
2007, Best Supporting Actress: Half Nelson (Nominated)
2007, Best Breakthrough Performance: Half Nelson (Nominated)
Boston Society of Film Critics
2007, Best Supporting Actress: Half Nelson (Winner)
Broadcast Film Critics Association Awards
2007, Best Young Actress: Half Nelson (Nominated)
Chicago Film Critics
2007, Most Promising Newcomer: Half Nelson (Nominated)
Independent Spirit Awards
2006, Best Female Lead: Half Nelson (Winner)
Online Film Critics Society
2007, Best Breakthrough Performance: Half Nelson (Nominated)
St. Louis Gateway Film Critics Association
2007, Best Supporting Actress: Half Nelson (Nominated)

References

External links
 

1989 births
Actresses from New York City
Independent Spirit Award for Best Female Lead winners
Living people
People from Brooklyn
21st-century American actresses
African-American actresses
American film actresses
21st-century African-American women
21st-century African-American people
20th-century African-American people
20th-century African-American women
Actors from Binghamton, New York